Pseudopostega didyma is a moth of the family Opostegidae. It was described by Donald R. Davis and Jonas R. Stonis, 2007. It is known from a moist tropical site located on the western slopes of the Andes and the Amazonian
Oriente Region in Ecuador.

The length of the forewings is 2.5–2.7 mm. Adults have been recorded in January.

Etymology
The species name is derived from the Greek didymos (meaning double), in reference to the characteristic double lobes of the male gnathos.

References

Opostegidae
Moths described in 2007